The Ben Darrah Water Tank and Well House near Shoshone, Idaho, United States, were built in c. 1916 by stonemason Bill Darrah.

It is covered by a concrete-coated wood plank cover. It is one of Bill Darrah's earlier water tank works, and was built for his brother Ben Darrah's upper ranch.

As of 1981 an Aermotor windmill tower and mechanism, non-functioning, rose from a well house in front of the water tank.  Its survival is unusual among Darrah's works.

The water tank and well house were deemed significant "both for their association with the development of sheep ranching in Lincoln County and for their lava rock craftsmanship."

Bill Darrah also built a water tank for the Arthur D. Silva ranch a few miles closer to Shoshone, in the late 1910s.

References

Buildings and structures completed in 1916
Buildings and structures in Lincoln County, Idaho
Agricultural buildings and structures on the National Register of Historic Places in Idaho
National Register of Historic Places in Lincoln County, Idaho
Windpumps in the United States
Water tanks on the National Register of Historic Places
Windmills on the National Register of Historic Places